The Azucareros de Villa Clara (Villa Clara Sugarmakers) is a baseball club that plays in the Cuban National Series. 

Based in Santa Clara, the Naranjas have been one of the league's most successful Cuban squads over the last 30 years; winning championships in 1983, as well as three-year run from 1993 to 1995. They also lost the 1996, 2003, 2004 and 2010 finals to the Industriales. Orange, white and black are their colors; although they have three different colors, the orange is what represents them, even though teams like Sancti Spíritus Gallos also wore orange uniforms. 

Eight Villa Clara's players have been members of the Cuba national baseball team in the World Baseball Classic. Ariel Borrero, Luis Borroto, Eduardo Paret and Ariel Pestano were on the roster in the 2006 tournament, while Leonys Martín, Eduardo Paret, Yolexis Ulacia and Pestano were in 2009.

History
Villa Clara was known as the Azucareros (sugar-makers) when Ciego de Ávila, Cienfuegos, Sancti Spíritus and Villa Clara were all represented by a single team. 

The name  was to represent the workers of all sugar mills in Cuba. Under this name, the team won three championships in 1969, 1971 and 1972. With the  moniker, Villa Clara won the National Series in 1983, led by Eduardo Martín Saura, and three consecutive years from 1993 through 1995 guided by Pedro Jova. 

On June 18, 2013 Villa Clara defeated Matanzas by a score of 7–4, clinching their first league championship since the 1994–1995 season.

Cuban National Series MVPs
 Modesto Verdura (P) (Azucareros)
 Antonio Muñoz 1B (Azucareros)
 Isidro Pérez P (Azucareros)
 Amado Zamora RF (Villa Clara)
 Oscar Machado LF (Villa Clara)

Other notable players

 Aquino Abreu (P)
 Rolando Arrojo
 Ariel Borrero (1B)
 Luis Borroto (P)
 Aledmys Díaz
 Yandy Díaz
 Angel López
 Leonys Martin
 Alberto Martínez 
 Víctor Mesa (OF)
 Silvio Montejo (OF)
 Eliecer Montes de Oca (P)
 Eduardo Paret (SS)
 Lázaro Pérez (C)
 Ariel Pestano (C)
 José Ramón Riscart
 José Riveira
 Eddy Rojas (OF)
 Reinaldo Santana
 Jorge Toca
 Andy Zamora

Defectors
Several Villa Clara players have left Cuba to play in the Major Leagues.
 Rolando Arrojo
 Yuniesky Betancourt
 Liván Hernández
 Dayán Viciedo
 Leonys Martin
 Aledmys Díaz
 Yandy Díaz

References

External links
Naranjas de Villa Clara – Article by Rogério Marzano (Spanish)

Baseball teams in Cuba
Santa Clara, Cuba